Lunxhëri is a former municipality in the Gjirokastër County, Albania. At the 2015 local government reform it became a subdivision of the municipality Gjirokastër. The population at the 2011 census was 1,941. The municipal unit consists of the villages Qestorat, Dhoksat, Këllëz, Mingul, Nokovë, Erind, Gjat, Kakoz, Karjan and Valare.

The area is known for its Albanian-speaking Orthodox Christian and Aromanian population.

See also
Lunxhëri region

References

Former municipalities in Gjirokastër County
Administrative units of Gjirokastër